Crossings is a two-player abstract strategy board game invented by Robert Abbott. The rules were published in Sid Sackson's A Gamut of Games.  Crossings was the precursor to Epaminondas, which uses a larger board and expanded rules.

Gameplay

Equipment
 1 8x8 gameboard
 32 stones (16 of each color)

Setup

This is the starting position of Crossings.

Object
 Cross one stone to the opponent's end of the gameboard.

Turns
 Play alternates with each player making one movement on a turn.
 Red takes the first turn.

Movement
A group is a series of one or more same-colored stones adjacent to one another in a line. (diagonal, horizontal, or vertical) A stone may belong to one or more groups.

 A player may move a single stone, an entire group, or a subgroup.
 A group consisting of a single stone may move one space diagonally or orthogonally into an empty square.
 A group must move along the line which defines it. It may move a number of spaces equal to the number of pieces in that group.
 When part of a group is moved (a subgroup), it must move along the line which defines it. It may move a number of spaces equal to the number of pieces in the subgroup.
 When a subgroup is moved it must involve one of the end stones.
 Pieces may not move onto an occupied square.

Capturing an enemy stone
 If the first stone in a moving group encounters a single enemy stone, the group's movement stops there, and the enemy stone is captured.
 If the first stone in a moving group encounters an end stone of an opponent's group, it can capture that stone if the opponent's group is smaller. The turn ends.
 If it cannot capture the end stone because the opponent's group is the same size or larger, it is not allowed to move on to that square.

End of the game
 A player potentially wins the game if they get a stone on the home row, or row farthest from their side. If their opponent cannot get a stone of their own onto the first player's home row in their next move, the first player wins. Otherwise, those stones are "locked"; they cannot be moved or captured. The next attempt at crossing, as this is called, will determine the winner (unless it, too, is immediately followed by a counter-crossing, and so on.)
 The game is a draw if no player can complete the objective. Draws are rare.

References

Board games introduced in 1969
Abstract strategy games
Games played on Go boards